One Last Tour was a worldwide farewell tour by Swedish electronic dance trio Swedish House Mafia following the announcement of their break-up in June 2012. The tour took place through November 2012 to March 2013.

Itinerary
On September 24, 2012, Swedish House Mafia announced the dates for their farewell tour appropriately named "One Last Tour". The tour kicked off in November 2012 and concluded in March 2013. The tour was taken across the world with the group performing in Russia, India, and South Africa for the first time. Tickets sold out in minutes and due to extremely high demand, additional shows were added. Part of the tour saw the trio play three nights at Stockholm's Friends Arena, performing to over 100,000 people across the three nights of November 2012. This marked their first and only performances on Swedish soil.

The group performed five shows in New York City, with the first at the Hammerstein Ballroom known as the "Black Tie Rave"—a charity event with a formal dress code in support of Hurricane Sandy relief and Save the Children.

Due to extremely high demand, additional shows were added, and the group made their final appearance at the Ultra Music Festival. On night one, Friday 15 March, they were the opening acts and on the final night, Sunday 24 March 24, they closed the show ending with the phrase "We Came, We Raved, We Loved" appearing on screen, which became the mantra of the whole tour. During this performance frequent collaborator John Martin joined the trio on stage to give his farewells and performed their songs "Save the World" and "Don't You Worry Child" which ended in a huge crowd singalong which Billboard described as "a powerful ending [for the] three-DJ Juggernauts".

Tour dates

Box office score data

References

2012 concert tours
Farewell concert tours